Muchmores Run is a  long 1st order tributary to the Ohio River in Hancock County, West Virginia.  This is the only stream of this name in the United States.

Course
Muchmores Run rises about 2.5 miles south of Newell, West Virginia, in Hancock County and then flows north to join the Ohio River at Newell.

Watershed
Muchmores Run drains  of area, receives about 38.0 in/year of precipitation, has a wetness index of 297.98, and is about 78% forested.

See also
List of rivers of West Virginia

References

Rivers of West Virginia
Rivers of Hancock County, West Virginia
Tributaries of the Ohio River